Christopher Matthew Miller (born January 20, 1968) is an American voice actor, animator, director, screenwriter, and storyboard artist employed by DreamWorks Animation. He is most known for directing Shrek the Third and Puss in Boots (for which he received his first Academy Award nomination) and for voicing Kowalski the penguin in the Madagascar film series.

Early life
Miller was born on January 20, 1968, in Washington, D.C. He studied animation at the California Institute of Arts.

Career
In an interview with Robert K. Elder for The Film That Changed My Life, Miller attributes his success in film to Sleeper. "I would be penniless and drunk on the corner, begging for cash, if I had not seen the film Sleeper. I guarantee you."

In 2011, Miller directed Puss in Boots, a spin-off and sequel to the Shrek franchise. His wife, Laura Gorenstein Miller, worked as a dance choreographer.

Filmography

Television

References

External links

 
 Chris Miller interview
 Filmmakers of Shrek interview

Living people
1968 births
American animated film directors
American animators
American male screenwriters
American male voice actors
American film directors
American storyboard artists
American voice directors
California Institute of the Arts alumni
DreamWorks Animation people
Sony Pictures Animation people